Brian Paul Ellis  is a New Zealand record producer, manager, and radio host. He is most known to audiences for being the former judge of New Zealand Idol and a former judge of the reality series New Zealand's Got Talent.

Ellis was appointed a Member of the New Zealand Order of Merit in the 2011 Queen's Birthday Honours, for services to the music industry.

In 2016, he was presented with the Fullers Entertainment Award from the Variety Artists Club of New Zealand for his services to the entertainment industry.

Ellis sits on the boards of The Starship Foundation and Digital Media Trust.

References

Year of birth missing (living people)
Living people
Members of the New Zealand Order of Merit
New Zealand television personalities
New Zealand Idol
People from Timaru